The 2016 MXGP of Europe was the third round of the 2016 FIM Motocross World Championship season. It was held in Valkenswaard, Netherlands on 27–28 March 2016. The race included the third rounds of the 2016 MXGP and MX2 world championships. It also included the second round of the 2016 FIM Women's Motocross World Championship and the first rounds of the 2016 UEM European 300cc Championship and 2016 UEM European 250cc Championship.

Entry lists

Entry list

MXGP entry list

1Steven Lenoir will stand in at 24MX Honda due to injuries for the team's riders.

2Riders making their debut in the MXGP class this weekend.

3Rider's entered but did not attend the grand prix for various reasons.

MX2 entry list

1These riders will make their MX2 class debut this weekend.
2De Waal entered but did not attend the grand prix.

WMX Entry List

MXGP

MXGP Practice Times

Free Practice

MXGP Timed Practice

|}

MXGP Qualifying Race

MXGP Races

Race 1

Race 2

1Jasikonis finished in 16th place but was then given a time penalty.

MXGP of Europe Overall

MX2

MX2 Practice Times

Free Practice

MX2 Timed Practice

MX2 Qualifying Race

1Brian Bogers broke his collarbone in an accident on the start straight, he will take no further part in the grand prix.

References

Europe
MXGP